Juris Eisaks (born 23 March 1958) is a Soviet (Latvian) luger who competed in the early 1980s. He is best known for finishing third in the men's doubles overall Luge World Cup in 1981-2.

Eisaks also finished seventh in the men's doubles event at the 1984 Winter Olympics in Sarajevo.

References

External links
1984 luge men's doubles results
List of men's doubles luge World Cup champions since 1978.

1958 births
Living people
Lugers at the 1984 Winter Olympics
Latvian male lugers
Soviet male lugers
Olympic lugers of the Soviet Union